Milan Rapaić (born 16 August 1973) is a Croatian former professional footballer who played as a midfielder. He primary played as an attacking midfielder or winger.

International career
He made his debut for Croatia in an April 1994 friendly match away against Slovakia, coming on as a 46th-minute substitute for Darko Vukić, and earned a total of 49 caps, scoring 5 goals.

Rapaić played two games for his country at the 2002 FIFA World Cup and is most remembered for his spectacular goal against Italy, which secured a come from behind 2–1 victory.

Rapaić was also included in Croatia's squad at Euro 2004 and played in three matches at the finals. On 17 June 2004, he scored a goal in Croatia's 2–2 draw with reigning champions France in the group stage.

He proved to be a fan favourite with his fun-loving playing style wherever he has played, and after impressive performances he once again earned a call up in August 2006 for the Croatian national side after missing the 2006 FIFA World Cup. Croatia went on to beat the world champions Italy 2–0 in Livorno, with Rapaić starting.

His final international was a March 2007 European Championship qualification match against Macedonia.

Personal life
Rapaić's son Boris is also a footballer.

Career statistics

International

Honours

Hajduk Split
Prva HNL: 1992, 1993–94, 1994–95
Croatian Cup: 1992–93, 1994–95, 2002–03
Croatian Super Cup: 1992, 1993, 1994

Fenerbahçe
Süper Lig: 2000–01

References

External links
 

1973 births
Living people
People from Nova Gradiška
Sport in Brod-Posavina County
Association football midfielders
Croatian footballers
Croatia international footballers
2002 FIFA World Cup players
UEFA Euro 2004 players
HNK Hajduk Split players
A.C. Perugia Calcio players
Fenerbahçe S.K. footballers
A.C. Ancona players
Standard Liège players
HNK Trogir players
Croatian Football League players
Serie A players
Süper Lig players
Serie B players
Belgian Pro League players
Croatian expatriate footballers
Expatriate footballers in Italy
Croatian expatriate sportspeople in Italy
Expatriate footballers in Turkey
Croatian expatriate sportspeople in Turkey
Expatriate footballers in Belgium
Croatian expatriate sportspeople in Belgium